The Tacoma Rainiers are a Minor League Baseball team of the Pacific Coast League (PCL) and the Triple-A affiliate of the Seattle Mariners. They are located in Tacoma, Washington, and play their home games at Cheney Stadium, which opened in 1960. Tacoma has competed in the PCL since 1960, including the 2021 season when it was known as the Triple-A West. The team operated under several monikers before becoming the Rainiers in 1995.

Tacoma has won the PCL championship six times (1961, 1969, 1978, 2001, 2010, and 2021).

History

Beginnings: Tacoma Tigers 
Tacoma's first team in the PCL was the Tacoma Tigers, who joined the league in 1904, having moved from Sacramento after the 1903 season. The 1904 Tigers won Tacoma's first PCL pennant, finishing first in both halves of the split season schedule, seven games (annualized) over the runner-up Los Angeles Angels. The 1905 Tigers won the first-half championship, then moved back to Sacramento, finishing out the season as the Sacramento Solons, and losing the postseason series to the Angels.

The PCL did not return to Tacoma for another 55 years; however, another Tacoma Tigers franchise operated in the Western International League from the 1930s through 1951. Owned by William Starr of San Diego, they were affiliated with the San Diego Padres of the PCL. The team was sold, relocated to north central Idaho, and became the Lewiston Broncs in 1952.

1960–1965: Tacoma Giants 
The current PCL franchise was founded in 1960 when the Phoenix Giants, an affiliate of the San Francisco Giants, moved to Tacoma and became the Tacoma Giants, the first team to play at brand-new Cheney Stadium.

The Giants' first win at Cheney Stadium came on April 16, 1960—an 11–0 victory over Portland in game two of a doubleheader. Future Hall Of Fame pitcher Juan Marichal worked the victory, giving Tacoma their first franchise shutout performance.

The 1961 iteration of the club posted a 97–57 record under manager Red Davis, who steered a team led by Gaylord Perry, Ron Herbel, Eddie Fisher, and Dick Phillips. Following a season in which he hit .264 with 16 home runs and 98 RBI, Phillips was named the 1961 PCL Most Valuable Player – he remains the only player in franchise history to earn the PCL MVP award.

1966–1971: Tacoma Cubs 
In 1965, the Giants decided to move the team back to Phoenix, however, the Chicago Cubs decided to move their affiliate, the Salt Lake City Bees, to Tacoma exactly the same year and renamed the team the Tacoma Cubs.

The club played as a Cubs affiliate for six seasons, compiling a  record. The Tacoma Cubs were managed by Whitey Lockman for their first four seasons, including a 1969 PCL Championship after finishing the year 86–60. The 1969 Cubs pitching staff compiled a 3.01 team ERA, and bested Eugene for the league championship 3–2 in a best-of-five series.

1972–1977: Tacoma Twins 
Following the 1971 season, the Chicago Cubs left town. Local businessmen Stan Naccarato and Clay Huntington spearheaded a group of local investors who purchased the franchise and secured an affiliation with the Minnesota Twins, who renamed the team the Tacoma Twins.

Through six seasons as a Twins affiliate, Tacoma compiled a  record with no league championships.

During the Twins era, infielder Rick Renick (1973–76) slugged his way to 72 home runs, giving him the most career home runs in franchise history. In the midst of a 1977 season in which he hit .321 with 25 home runs and 117 RBI, first baseman Randy Bass notched four home runs on June 9, 1977 at Phoenix – he is one of only six players in PCL history to send out four or more home runs in a single contest.

Jerry Howarth, Toronto Blue Jays broadcaster, broadcast games for them during this time period.

1978: Tacoma Yankees 
For one season, the Tacoma franchise found themselves affiliated with the New York Yankees. While the Yankees compiled a 100-win 1978 season that culminated in an American League East title over the Boston Red Sox, the Tacoma Yankees compiled an 80–57 record and advanced to the league championship.

After the 1978 PCL Championship series with Albuquerque was cancelled due to rain, Tacoma and Albuquerque were named PCL Co-Champions.

1979 Tacoma Tugs and 1980 Tacoma Tigers 
Following an affiliation change to the Cleveland Indians, a local contest was held and long-time Tacoma resident, Gary W. Grip won with his entry, the Tacoma Tugs.  Grip drew his inspiration for the name from the many tugboats in the Tacoma waters.  The franchise was renamed the Tacoma Tugs, marking the first time the team's nickname did not align with its major league club. After one season as the Tugs, the team returned to the Tigers nickname in 1980.

The team finished with nearly identical records in both years as a Cleveland affiliate, going 74–73 in 1979, and 74–74 in 1980.

1981–1994: Tacoma Tigers 
Following their brief stints with the Yankees and Indians, the team moved their affiliation to the Oakland A's, a partnership that  lasted fourteen seasons.

While the affiliation with Oakland provided five playoffs appearances for Tacoma fans, it produced no league championships. Future American League Rookies of the Year Walt Weiss, Jose Canseco, and Mark McGwire all spent time in Tacoma during this period. Scott Brosius, Tacoma's current hitting coach, also played for Tacoma during the Oakland era.

1995–present: Tacoma Rainiers 

The team became associated with the nearby Seattle Mariners in 1995, whose Triple-A team for the previous ten seasons had been the Calgary Cannons. On November 3, 1994, Tacoma announced it had adopted the Rainiers name in part as a tribute to the Seattle Rainiers minor league teams that played in Seattle from 1938 to 1964 in the PCL, and again from 1972 to 1976 in the Northwest League (NWL). The Tacoma Rainiers play their home games at Cheney Stadium, which hosted the baseball portion of the 1990 Goodwill Games.

Since their affiliation began with the Mariners in 1995, nearly all of the organization's home-grown prospects have passed through Tacoma, including Alex Rodriguez, Raul Ibanez, Felix Hernandez, J. J. Putz, Kyle Seager, Ken Griffey Jr. (on rehab assignments), and more.

Tacoma was managed by Dan Rohn from 2001 to 2005, a three-time PCL Manager of the Year Award recipient. Under Rohn's direction, the Rainiers compiled a  record.

The Tacoma Rainiers shared a PCL championship in 2001 with New Orleans after the September 11 attacks forced the cancellation of the championship series. The Rainiers advanced to the championship series in 2005, but were swept by the Nashville Sounds. The Tacoma Rainers won its second PCL championship in 2010.

The Rainiers are broadcast on KHHO 850 AM by play-by-play announcer Mike Curto, who has been with the club since 1999.

In conjunction with Major League Baseball's restructuring of Minor League Baseball in 2021, the Rainiers were organized into the Triple-A West. Tacoma ended the season as champions of the Western Division by finishing in first place with a 73–47 record. No playoffs were held to determine a league champion; instead the Rainiers also won the Triple-A West championship by having the best regular-season record among all 10 teams. However, 10 games that had been postponed from the start of the season were reinserted into the schedule as a postseason tournament called the Triple-A Final Stretch in which all 30 Triple-A clubs competed for the highest winning percentage. Tacoma finished the tournament tied for 13th place with a 5–5 record. In 2022, the Triple-A West became known as the Pacific Coast League, the name historically used by the regional circuit prior to the 2021 reorganization.

Season-by-season records

Postseason history

1961 Tacoma Giants 
The 1961 Tacoma Giants finished the season with a record of 97–57 (.630), which still stands as the best season in the club's PCL history. No playoffs were held in 1961; instead, the Giants clinched the league championship by earning the top spot in the league's sole, eight-team division. The club finished the season going 57–10 over their final 67 games, including a 16-game winning streak.

1969 Tacoma Cubs 
The 1969 Tacoma Cubs finished the season with an 86–60 (.589) record, and earned the franchise's second league championship. The Cubs won the four-team Northern Division by 14 games to advance to the league championship. After going down 0–2 in the championship series to Eugene, then a Philadelphia Phillies affiliate, the Cubs rallied to win three straight games, clinching the five-game series. Cubs pitcher Archie Reynolds fired a complete game, two-hit shutout in game four to force a deciding fifth game. The 1969 Cubs were the first Tacoma team to win a championship playoff series.

1971 Tacoma Cubs 
The Tacoma Cubs compiled a record of 78–65 (.545) and returned to the PCL championship series just two short years after winning the league title. This time, the Cubs would fall to the Salt Lake Angels, three games to one. After falling behind 0–1 in the series, Cubs starting pitcher Jim Colborn fired a 10-inning, complete-game winning effort in game two, surrendering only one run and evening the series. Tacoma played the series without Adrian Garrett, who had hit a franchise record 43 home runs during the regular season before being sold to Oakland on August 31.

1978 Tacoma Yankees 
Tacoma finished with a record of 80–57 (.584) during their only season as a Yankees affiliate and was declared PCL co-champions, along with Albuquerque, after inclement weather in the Pacific Northwest forced the league office to cancel the playoffs.

1981 Tacoma Tigers 
For the first time since the PCL switched to a split-season format, Tacoma made the playoffs after finishing 43–27 in the second half to win the Northern Division. The Tigers defeated Hawaii, winners of the first half, two games to one to advance to the PCL championship series against Albuquerque. The Dukes would go on to sweep the Tigers 3–0 on a combined score of 22–7 to win the PCL championship.

2001 Tacoma Rainiers 
While the Seattle Mariners compiled a major league record 116 wins, the Rainiers put together an 85–59 (.590) record to win the Northern Division by  games. The 2001 Rainiers led the Pacific Coast League with a 3.74 team ERA, while the offense finished fifth in the league in runs scored. Tacoma defeated Sacramento 3–2, after falling behind in the Pacific Conference series 2–1, to move on to the championship series. Tacoma and New Orleans were scheduled to begin the series on September 11, before it was cancelled in the aftermath of the September 11 terrorist attacks. The league office announced that Tacoma and New Orleans would be declared co-champions of the 2001 season.

2005 Tacoma Rainiers 
The 2005 Rainiers finished 80–64 (.556) under the guidance of manager Dan Rohn. The Rainiers clinched the Pacific Conference Northern Division crown on the second-to-last day of the season, eliminating a Salt Lake team that had won their final nine games of the season. Tacoma dropped the first two games of the five-game Pacific Conference series at home against Sacramento, before taking the final three games at Raley Field to advance to the championship. After falling behind 0–1 in the series to Nashville, a season-high five errors in game two sunk the Rainiers and gave the Sounds a 2–0 series advantage. In the 13th inning of game three, eventual series MVP Nelson Cruz launched a three-run home run to give Nashville a 5–2 victory and the PCL championship.

2009 Tacoma Rainiers 
The 2009 Rainiers, guided by manager Daren Brown, worked a record of 74–70 to sneak into the postseason. Tacoma was quickly eliminated from championship contention after dropping the conference series to Sacramento, 3–1.

2010 Tacoma Rainiers 
The Rainiers went into playoffs with its home ballpark, Cheney Stadium, under construction. Displaced from its home field, Rainiers were forced to look for other venues to play its playoff home games. The first round of playoff games against the Sacramento Rivercats saw the Rainiers winning two straight on the road, then coming "home" to the ballpark of its parent club, the Seattle Mariners, at Safeco Field. The Rainiers then dropped two straight games at Safeco Field, before winning Game 5 to advance to the PCL championship series against the Memphis Redbirds.

Due to Safeco Field not being available for the championship series and no other ballpark in the Pacific Northwest meeting PCL requirements, the Rainiers were forced to play all games in the finals on the road. For Games 1 and 2 (the Rainiers' "home" games) the team batted second against the "visiting" Memphis Redbirds, with AutoZone Park in Memphis, Tennessee, (the Redbirds' home park) hosting all the games. Having a hostile crowd even in its "home" games, the Rainiers nonetheless swept the Redbirds in three games to win the 2010 PCL championship.

The Columbus Clippers defeated the Rainiers, 12–6, on September 21, 2010, to win the Triple-A Baseball National Championship Game in Oklahoma City.

Uniforms 
In March 2015, the Tacoma Rainiers announced a set of new logo marks and additions to the club's uniform set. An updated version of the team's script logo, introduced in 1995, became the club's primary logo mark. A long-standing fan-favorite, the standalone "R" logo, became the team's secondary mark.

In addition to the logo marks, a new look was given to the club's home alternate, away, and batting practice uniforms. A red alternate jersey, worn with a new red hat, was added to the rotation of uniform sets. The club's new road uniform was modeled after the Tacoma Giants uniforms of the 1960s with a gray color scheme and block letters on the front. The final addition to the uniform set was a new batting practice cap, adorned with a mountain outline and a climbing axe with a baseball bat handle.

Roster

Notes

References

O'Neal, Bill. The Pacific Coast League 1903–1988. Eakin Press, Austin TX, 1990. .
Snelling, Dennis. The Pacific Coast League: A Statistical History, 1903–1957  McFarland & Company, Inc., Jefferson, NC, 1995. 
Tacoma Rainiers

External links

 
 Interview about Rainiers' first season as Mariners affiliate

 
Baseball teams established in 1960
Pacific Coast League teams
Professional baseball teams in Washington (state)
Sports in Tacoma, Washington
Seattle Mariners minor league affiliates
1960 establishments in Washington (state)
Triple-A West teams